Jason Jones (born August 30, 1983) is a former gridiron football wide receiver. He was signed by the Buffalo Bills as an undrafted free agent in 2008. He played college football for the Arkansas-Pine Bluff.

Jones was also a member of the Arizona Rattlers and Kansas City Command of the Arena Football League, the BC Lions of the Canadian Football League and the Sioux Falls Storm and Allen Wranglers of the Indoor Football League.

External links
BC Lions bio

1983 births
Living people
People from Forrest City, Arkansas
Players of American football from Arkansas
American players of Canadian football
Canadian football wide receivers
American football wide receivers
Arkansas–Pine Bluff Golden Lions football players
Buffalo Bills players
Arizona Rattlers players
Sioux Falls Storm players
Kansas City Command players
Allen Wranglers players